Non-marine molluscs of Israel are a part of the molluscan fauna of Israel. A number of species of non-marine molluscs are found in the wild in Israel. In addition, a number of gastropod species are reared in captivity in greenhouses, aquaria and terraria.

Freshwater gastropods

Land gastropods 
Land gastropods in Israel include<ref>Commonwealth of Australia. 2002 (April) [http://www.daff.gov.au/__data/assets/pdf_file/0015/24702/fin_egyptian_citrus.pdf Citrus Imports from the Arab Republic of Egypt. A Review Under Existing Import Conditions for Citrus from Israel] . Agriculture, Fisheries and Forestry, Australia. Caption: Gastropods, p. 12 and Appendix 2.</ref>

Aciculidae
 Acicula palaestinensis Forcart, 1981

Pomatiidae
 Pomatias glaucus (G. B. Sowerby II, 1843) (usually under the synonymous name Pomatias olivieri (Charpentier, 1847)Raz S., Schwartz N. P., Mienis H. K., Nevo E. & Graham J. H. (2012). "Fluctuating Helical Asymmetry and Morphology of Snails (Gastropoda) in Divergent Microhabitats at 'Evolution Canyons I and II,’ Israel". PLoS ONE 7(7): e41840. .)

Ellobiidae
 Carychium minimum O. F. Müller, 1774

Succineidae
 Novisuccinea hortensis (Reinhardt, 1877) - non-indigenous
 Novisuccinea ovalis (Say, 1817) - non-indigenous
 Oxyloma elegans (Risso, 1826)

Chondrinidae
 Granopupa granum (Draparnaud, 1801)
 Rupestrella rhodia (J. R. Roth, 1839)

Gastrocoptidae
 Gastrocopta cf. pellucida (L. Pfeiffer, 1841) - non-indigenous
 Gastrocopta procera (A. Gould, 1840) - non-indigenous

Lauriidae
 Lauria cylindracea (Da Costa, 1778)

Orculidae
 Orculella sirianocoriensis (Mousson, 1854)
 Pilorcula raymondi (Bourguignat, 1863)

Pleurodiscidae
 Pleurodiscus balmei (Potiez & Michaud, 1838) (under the synonymous name Pleurodiscus erdelii (J. R. Roth, 1839))

Pupillidae
 Pupoides coenopictus (T. Hutton, 1834)

Pyramidulidae
 Pyramidula rupestris (also under the name Pyramidula hierosolymitana (Bourguignat, 1852))

TruncatellinidaeTruncatellina haasi Venmans, 1957

Valloniidae
 Vallonia costata (O. F. Müller, 1774) - non-indigenous
 Vallonia excentrica Sterki, 1893 - non-indigenous
 Vallonia costata (O. F. Müller, 1774) - non-indigenous

Enidae
 Buliminus alepensis (L. Pfeiffer, 1841)
 Buliminus diminutus (Mousson, 1861)
 Buliminus glabratus (Mousson, 1861)
 Buliminus jordani (Charpentier, 1847)
 Buliminus labrosus labrosus (Olivier, 1804)
 Buliminus lamprostatus (Bourguignat, 1876)
 Buliminus negevensis Heller, 1970
 Buliminus sinaiensis Heller, 1970
 Buliminus therinus (Bourguignat, 1876)
 Euchondrus albulus (Mousson, 1861)
 Euchondrus chondriformis (Mousson, 1861)
 Euchondrus desertorum Rochanaburananda, 1981
 Euchondrus haasi Forcart, 1981
 Euchondrus michonii (Bourguignat, 1853) (including Euchondrus ledereri (L. Pfeiffer, 1868))
 Euchondrus pseudovularis Forcart, 1981
 Euchondrus ramonensis (Granot, 1988) - endemicHeller J. 1996. Euchondrus ramonensis. 2006 IUCN Red List of Threatened Species. Downloaded on 7 August 2007.
 Euchondrus saulcyi (Bourguignat, 1852)
 Euchondrus septemdentatus (Roth, 1839)
 Euchondrus sulcidens (Mousson, 1861)
 Paramastus episomus (Bourguignat, 1857)
 Pene bulimoides (L. Pfeiffer, 1842)
 Pene galilaea Heller, 1972 - endemic
 Pene kotschyi (L. Pfeiffer, 1854)
 Turanena benjamitica (Benson, 1859)
 Turanena hermonensis (Forcart, 1981)

Clausiliidae
 Cristataria elonensis (G. Haas, 1951)
 Cristataria forcarti H. Nordsieck, 1971
 Cristataria genezarethana (Tristram, 1865)
 Cristataria haasi H. Nordsieck, 1971
 Cristataria haasi haasi H. Nordsieck, 1971
 Cristataria haasi kharbatensis H. Nordsieck, 1971
 Cristataria hermonensis H. Nordsieck, 1977
 Cristataria petrboki (Pallary, 1939)
 Elia moesta (Rossmässler, 1839)
 Elia moesta georgi Forcart, 1975
 Elia moesta moesta (Rossmässler, 1839) - non-indigenous

Ferussaciidae
 Calaxis gracilis Forcart, 1981
 Calaxis hierosolymarum (J. R. Roth, 1855)
 Calaxis rothi (Bourguignat, 1864)
 Cecilioides acicula (O. F. Müller, 1774)
 Cecilioides genezarethensis Forcart, 1981
 Cecilioides tumulorum (Bourguignat, 1856) (under the synonymous name Cecilioides judaica (Mousson, 1861))
 Hohenwartiana hohenwarti (Rossmässler, 1839)

Achatinidae
 Achatina fulica Bowdich, 1822 - non-indigenous
 Lamellaxis clavulinus (Potiez & Michaud, 1838) - non-indigenous
 Rumina decollata (Linnaeus, 1758) - non-indigenousMienis H. K. 2003. A new colony of Rumina saharica discovered in Israel. Tentacle No. 11—January 2003: 11-12.
 Rumina saharica Pallary, 1901 - non-indigenous

Helicodiscidae
 Lucilla scintilla (Lowe, 1852) - non-indigenous

Punctidae
 Paralaoma servilis (Shuttleworth, 1852)
 Punctum pygmaeum (Draparnaud, 1801)

Euconulidae
 Euconulus alderi (Gray, 1840) (under the synonymous name Euconulus praticola (Reinhardt, 1883)

Gastrodontidae
 Zonitoides arboreus (Say, 1816) - non-indigenous
 Zonitoides nitidus (O. F. Müller, 1774) - non-indigenous

Pristilomatidae
 Hawaiia minuscula (A. Binney, 1841) - non-indigenous
 Vitrea contracta (Westerlund, 1871)

Oxychilidae
 Eopolita protensa jebusitica (Roth, 1855)
 Libania saulcyi (Bourguignat, 1852)
 Oxychilus camelinus (Bourguignat, 1852)
 Oxychilus renanianus (Pallary, 1939)
 Oxychilus translucidus (Mortillet, 1854) - non-indigenous

Milacidae
 Milax barypus Bourguignat, 1866

Limacidae
 Gigantomilax cecconii (Simroth, 1906)
 Gigantomilax eustrictus (Bourguignat, 1866)
 Lehmannia valentiana (de Férussac, 1822) - non-indigenous
 Limacus flavus (Linnaeus, 1758)

Agriolimacidae
 Deroceras berytensis (Bourguignat, 1852)
 Deroceras laeve (O. F. Müller, 1774) - non-indigenous
 Deroceras libanoticum (Pollonera, 1909)
 Deroceras reticulatum (O. F. Müller, 1774) - non-indigenous

Geomitridae
 Cochlicella acuta (O. F. Müller, 1774)
 Cochlicella barbara (Linnaeus, 1758)  - non-indigenous
 Microxeromagna lowei (Potiez & Michaud, 1838)
 Xerocrassa davidiana (Bourguignat, 1863)
 Xerocrassa erkelii (Kobelt, 1878)
 Xerocrassa fourtaui (Pallary, 1902)<
 Xerocrassa helleri (Forcart, 1976)ref name=Forcart1976/>
 Xerocrassa langloisiana (Bourguignat, 1853)
 Xerocrassa meda (Porro, 1840) - non-indigenous
 Xerocrassa picardi (F. Haas, 1933)
 Xerocrassa pseudojacosta (Forcart, 1976)
 Xerocrassa seetzeni (L. Pfeiffer, 1847)
 Xerocrassa simulata (Ehrenberg, 1831)
 Xerocrassa tuberculosa (Conrad, 1852)
 Xerocrassa zviae Mienis, 2017
 Xeropicta carmelensis Forcart, 1976
 Xeropicta ilanae Forcart, 1981
 Xeropicta krynickii (Krynicki, 1833) (often under the synonymous names X. vestalis (L. Pfeiffer, 1841) or X.vestalis joppensis (Schmidt, 1855))
 Xeropicta zeevbari Mienis & Rittner, 2020
 Xerotricha apicina (Lamarck, 1822)
 Xerotricha conspurcata (Draparnaud, 1801)  - non-indigenous

Helicidae
 Cornu aspersum (O. F. Müller, 1774)  - non-indigenous
 Eobania vermiculata (O. F. Müller, 1774)
 Eremina desertorum (Forsskål, 1775)
 Eremina kobelti (Westerlund, 1889)
 Helix engaddensis Bourguignat, 1852 (including Helix prasinata Roth, 1855)
 Helix pachya Bourguignat, 1860 (often under the synonymous name Helix texta auct.)
 Levantina spiriplana (Olivier, 1801)
 Levantina spiriplana caesareana (Mousson, 1854)
 Levantina spiriplana spiriplana (Olivier, 1801) (including Levantina hierosolyma (Mousson, 1854))
 Theba pisana (O. F. Müller, 1774)

Hygromiidae
 Metafruticicola berytensis (L. Pfeiffer, 1841) (including Metafruticicola fourousi (Bourguignat, 1863))
 Metafruticicola hermonensis Forcart, 1981
 Monacha bari Forcart, 1981
 Monacha crispulata (Mousson, 1861)
 Monacha obstructa (Férussac, 1821)
 Monacha syriaca (Ehrenberg, 1831)

Sphincterochilidae
 Sphincterochila cariosa (Olivier, 1804)
 Sphincterochila fimbriata (Bourguignat, 1852)
 Sphincterochila prophetarum (Bourguignat, 1852)
 Sphincterochila zonata (Bourguignat, 1853)
 Sphincterochila zonata filia (Mousson, 1861)
 Sphincterochila zonata zonata (Bourguignat, 1853) (including Sphincterochila boissieri (Charpentier, 1847)).

Trissexodontidae
 Caracollina lenticula (Michaud, 1831)

Freshwater bivalves

Hothouse aliens 
"Hothouse aliens" in Israel include:

See also
 Wildlife of Israel

References

External links 
 Israel's Land Molluscs - Nature of Israel by Oz Rittner

Molluscs, non-marine
Israel
Israel